, is an eight square kilometre Japanese island forming part of the Satsunan Islands, which are usually classed with the Ōsumi Islands. It belongs to Kagoshima Prefecture and it is administered by the city of Nishinoomote on Tanegashima.

Geography

The terrain is mostly low and flat. The island does not have rivers and its geology is not suitable for agriculture.

Main place names 
Hayama (葉山), Ou Komori (王籠), Takabo (高坊), Kakise (垣瀬), Shiinoki (椎ノ木).

Rocks and reef 
Geographical Survey Institute map (extract). Excludes land-connected beaches, small rocks on the reef, and unnamed rocks.

Bose (房瀬) - Cape Ueno.
Kose (小瀬), Katahirase (片平瀬), Ohirase (大平瀬), Kakise (垣瀬) - West side.
Kitakojima (北小島), Onase (女瀬) - Cape Shimono.
Takase (高瀬), Tsumasaki (ツマ崎) - Southeast side.
Yokose (横瀬) - East side.

Wildlife 
There are Sika deer on the island. The surrounding area has good fishing grounds.

Climate 

The island’s climate is classified as subtropical, with a rainy season from May through September.

History

Kamakura period to postwar

Mageshima has been occupied, at least seasonally, since the Kamakura period (1185–1333 CE), as fishermen from neighboring Tanegashima would use it as a base of operations. The inhabitants were evacuated during World War II for security reasons. In 1951, an effort was made to colonize the island with government assistance, and the island population reached a peak of 528 people in 113 households in 1958. The economy of the island was based on the production of sugar cane and vinegar, as well as commercial fishing. However, difficulties with agriculture due to pests, and due to foreign competition caused many islanders to abandon the island from the late 1960s.

Uninhabited

In 1974, the Heiwa Sogo Bank started a resort venture and floated plans for construction of the national oil reserve on the island, but neither plan came to fruition. In March 1980, the last resident left the island.

In 1995, a subsidiary of Tateishi Construction acquired the island, and announced plans to construct a landing field for the Japanese spaceplane, HOPE-X, on the island. Other plans to establish a spent nuclear fuel storage facility were also announced. However, subsequently no construction has been taken and the HOPE-X project itself was cancelled in 2003.

Land acquisition & military base

In 2009, Mageshima came under consideration as a possible relocation site for the Marine Corps Air Station Futenma in Ginowan, Okinawa, or at least as a site for the United States Navy to relocate its aircraft carrier aircraft touch-and-go training. However, Tateishi Construction subsequently came under investigation for tax fraud and for collusion with politicians over the project. Initial logging to clear an area for the proposed runways was performed without proper permission, and in September 2011 local fishermen filed lawsuits alleging damage to fishing grounds due to increased runoff created by the illegal logging.

In 2011, Japan agreed to provide the US Military with a new training site instead of Iwo To (formerly called Iwo Jima) which is much further south  of Japan's main islands.

In November 2019, the Government of Japan made an agreement with the Tokyo-based development company Taston Airport to purchase Mageshima for 16 billion yen ($146 million). It will become a base of the Japan Self-Defense Forces and a training site to conduct landing practices for U.S. aircraft carrier-based aircraft. Japanese Chief Cabinet Secretary Yoshihide Suga said "purchase of Mageshima Island is extremely important and serves for strengthening deterrence by the Japan-US alliance as well as Japan's defense capability". In addition the base will supply the Nansei Islands.

On November 29, 2022, Kagoshima's governor Koichi Shiota agreed to the construction of the base citing the  "increasingly severe security environment" surrounding Japan. Construction started on January 12, 2023 and is expected to take 4 years.

See also

 Desert island
 List of islands

References

McCormack, Gavin. Resistant Islands: Okinawa Confronts Japan and the United States. Bowman & Littlefield (2012)  -

External links 
 
 site with photos

Ōsumi Islands
Islands of Kagoshima Prefecture
JAXA
Japan Self-Defense Forces
United States Navy